Michael James Shaw (born September 16, 1986) is an American actor and writer from New York City. He is best known for his recurring role as FBI Agent Daryl/"Mike" in the TV series Limitless. Shaw has also had a recurring role in Constantine as Papa Midnite and had a role in several shorts like Don-o-mite and Today _ _ cks. He also had a small role in Roots as Marcellus. Shaw portrayed Corvus Glaive in the Marvel Cinematic Universe films Avengers: Infinity War and Avengers: Endgame.

Early life
Shaw's very first starring role was as the Big Bad Wolf in his Kindergarten production of The Three Piggy Opera at Madison Street School of Basics Plus in Ocala, Florida. Shaw graduated from Vanguard High School in 2005. Upon graduating from High School, Shaw spent his undergraduate years at Howard University. He then took a masters program at Juilliard School.

Filmography

Television

Film

References

External links

1986 births
Living people
American male film actors
American male television actors
Howard University alumni
Juilliard School alumni
Male actors from New York City